This is a list of nonfiction works that have been made into feature films. The title of the work is followed by the work's author, the title of the film, and the year of the film. If a film has an alternate title based on geographical distribution, the title listed will be that of the widest distribution area.

The list does not include documentary films that are based on real events and people which are not based chiefly on a written work. For other documentary film categories, see documentaries.

Books

Biographies

Autobiographies and memoirs

Manuals and self-help books

Essays and articles

See also
Film adaptation
Films based on the Bible
List of films based on magazine articles
Lists of works of fiction made into feature films
Lists of film source material

References

Lists of books
Lists of works adapted into films
Literature lists